Lecithocera megalopis is a moth in the family Lecithoceridae. It is found in Taiwan, China (Jiangxi) and the Philippines.

The wingspan is 16–17 mm. The forewings are pale ochreous-yellowish or whitish-ochreous, more or less sprinkled with fuscous. The discal stigmata are large and black, the second connected with the tornus by a rather dark fuscous shade. There is a marginal series of small dark fuscous dots around the apex and termen. The hindwings are light grey.

References

Moths described in 1916
megalopis
Taxa named by Edward Meyrick
Moths of Asia